Botelloides chrysalidus is a species of sea snail, a marine gastropod mollusk in the family Trochidae, the top snails.

Subspecies
 Botelloides chrysalidus chrysalidus (Chapman & Gabriel, 1914) (synonym: Rissoa (Onoba) chrysalidus Chapman & Gabriel, 1914)
 Botelloides chrysalidus kendricki Ponder, 1985

Description
The height of the shell attains 3.1 mm, its diameter 1.5 mm. The stoutly built and polished shell has a pupiform shape. The four whorls are depressed convex. The spiral and helicoid apex consists of 2½ turns. The shallow sutures are excavated. The circular aperture has a thick lip. There are faint colour bands parallel with and near to the sutures, as seen in some specimens. The surface shows, under a high magnification, fine growth lines.

Distribution
This marine species is endemic to Australia and occurs off South Australia and Western Australia .

References

 Chapman, F. & Gabriel, C.J. 1914. Descriptions of New and Rare fossils obtained by Deep Boring in the Mallee. ii. Mollusca. Proceedings of the Royal Society of Victoria XXVI: 301-330, 5 pl
 Ponder, W.F. 1985. A revision of the genus Botelloides (Mollusca: Gastropoda: Trochacea). Department of Mines and Energy, South Australia, Special Publication 5: 301-327

External links
 To World Register of Marine Species

chrysalidus
Gastropods of Australia
Gastropods described in 1914